Orford is a surname. Notable people with the surname include:

 Charles Orford (1899–1977), English footballer
 Jeff Orford, Australian rugby league footballer
 John Orford, British classical bassoonist
 Lewis Orford (1865–1948), English lawyer and cricketer
 Margie Orford, South African writer
 Martin Orford, keyboard player of the progressive rock band IQ
 Matt Orford, Australian rugby league footballer
 Nicole Orford, Canadian ice dancer
 Robert Orford, Bishop of Ely from 1302 to 1310
 Sandy Orford (1911–1986), Welsh rugby league player and wrestler

Fictional people
 Ellen Orford, a character in Benjamin Britten's 1945 opera Peter Grimes

See also
 Earl of Orford